The  (pronounced “nah-gah-reh”) is a concept car that was introduced by Mazda at the 2006 Los Angeles Auto Show.  The Nagare is considered to be an exercise in natural and organic car design to explore the future of Mazda automobiles.  Its name “Nagare” translates into English as “flow” and the designers specifically studied motion and the effect it has on natural surroundings when creating this vehicle.

It was designed by Laurens van den Acker, Mazda's global design director at the time (since replaced by Ikuo Maeda), and his advanced design studio team in Irvine, California.  As head of the international Nagare design team, Laurens’ main task from Mazda was to design first and engineering later. He has since been replaced by Ikuo Maeda.

“The Nagare is a celebration of proportions and surface language that will evolve into subsequent designs planned for presentation at future international auto shows.  Nagare examines light and shadow, and begins to reveal the global design cues for the next generation of Mazda vehicles,” said Laurens.  “We’re looking well down the road with Nagare. We want to suggest where Mazda design will be in 2020.  To do that, we redefined basic proportions and the idea of driving without losing the emotional involvement.  Mazda’s driving spirit will be enhanced and intensified by Nagare.”

Styling 
The Mazda Nagare is a celebration of proportions and surface language according to its designers.  Its bodylines flow like liquid across its smooth seamless design and there are no distinguishing marks that detract from the overall theme of the car.  It has a large windshield that rakes at a very steep angle molding itself into the glass roof of the car.  Its large and aggressive wheels are wrapped into the wheel wells, incorporating them as a part of the body.

Two double-length doors hinge forward when opened and spread from the cabin like the wings of a butterfly.  Inside, you find the driver’s seat centrally located in the front of the cabin and three passenger rear seats arranged in a "wrap-around lounge" in the back.  The interior continues the Nagare's organic themes with futuristic elliptical controls and dials relating information to the driver.

Engine 
Powertrain details are largely speculated at this time.  Mazda has not released information on the specifics of the engine and its performance because they want to focus on the design elements of the car.  Some believe that the Nagare could be equipped with a future Mazda hydrogen-fueled rotary engine.

Technical Details 
Mazda is maintaining the soul of a sports car, like all their products, with the design of the Nagare.  The body work is not only form but functional in decreasing wind drag.  The wheels of the Nagare are also positioned at the far corners of the envelope for quick steering response and agile maneuverability.

Production Applications 
The 2010 Mazda3 is advertised as having "Nagare-inspired illuminated headlight details" on the top-of-the-line Grand Touring trim.

The 2012 Mazda5 was Mazda's first car to receive "Nagare design", including the curving lines along the sides of the vehicle.

Gallery

References 

 LA Auto Show: Concept Cars "autos.yahoo." Jon Alain Guzik, December 2006.  Retrieved on 2007-01-15.
 LA Auto Show: Mazda Nagare Concept wedges into the spotlight "autoblog." John Neff, Nov 29th 2006. Retrieved on 2007-01-15.
 LA Auto Show "LA Auto Show." Retrieved on 2007-01-15.
 Nagare Concept Gallery "Mazda Nagare Concept Gallery." Retrieved on 2010-01-20.

External links 
 Mazda Nagare - Official Mazda Site
 Nagare Press Release - Official Mazda press release

Nagare